Diego Ossa Vives (born 14 April 2004) is a Chilean professional footballer who plays as a Striker for Chilean club Universidad Católica.

Club career

Universidad Catolica
Ossa made his professional debut playing for Universidad Catolica in a 2022 agains Everton on 06 August 2022

International career
Ossa represented Chile at under-20 level in the 2023 South American Championship.

Career statistics

Club

References

External links
 

2004 births
Living people
Footballers from Santiago
Chilean footballers
Chile under-20 international footballers
Association football forwards
Chilean Primera División players
Club Deportivo Universidad Católica footballers
21st-century Chilean people